The Arleta Branch Library, also known as the Arleta Carnegie Library and the Wikman Building, is a Carnegie library building in Portland, Oregon's Foster-Powell neighborhood, in the United States.

History
The library building was designed by Folger Johnson and built in 1918 with funds provided by the Carnegie Corporation. In 2016, the building was listed on the National Register of Historic Places.

See also
List of Carnegie libraries in Oregon
National Register of Historic Places listings in Southeast Portland, Oregon

References

External links

1918 establishments in Oregon
Carnegie libraries in Oregon
Foster-Powell, Portland, Oregon
Libraries established in 1918
Libraries on the National Register of Historic Places in Oregon
Library buildings completed in 1918
Multnomah County Library
National Register of Historic Places in Portland, Oregon